This page lists the results of leadership conventions held by the British Columbia Liberal Party.

1902 leadership convention
Held February 6, 1902.
  Joseph Martin 47
William Wallace Burns McInnes 17
John Cunningham Brown 8
George Ritchie Maxwell 4
Scattering 14

(Source: "Canadian Annual Review 1902", p. 85)

1903 election by party caucus
Joseph Martin resigned as Liberal leader on June 2, 1903. Following his personal defeat in the 1903 general election, the first on a partisan basis, James Alexander MacDonald was elected leader by a party caucus on October 19, 1903.

First ballot:

Stuart Alexander Henderson 5
James Alexander MacDonald 5
William Wallace Burns McInnes 5

Second ballot:
William Wallace Burns McInnes 6
MacDONALD, James Alexander 5
Stuart Alexander Henderson 4

Third ballot (Runoff between McInnes and MacDonald):
James Alexander MacDonald 11
William Wallace Burns McInnes 4

Fourth ballot (McInnes eliminated):
  James Alexander MacDonald 10
Stuart Alexander Henderson 4

(Source: "Canadian Annual Review 1903", pgs. 222–223)

Developments 1909–1912
John Oliver was elected leader by a meeting of the caucus and provincial executive October 10, 1909.

1912 leadership convention
Held March 1, 1912
 Harlan Carey Brewster (acclaimed)

1918 election by party caucus
On March 5, 1918, John Oliver was elected leader on the fourth ballot, defeating James Horace King and John Wallace de Beque Farris. William Sloan and John Duncan MacLean were eliminated on previous ballots.

  John Oliver
 James Horace King
 John Wallace de Begue Farris
 William Sloan
 John Duncan MacLean

Source: "Morning Leader", March 6, 1918

Developments 1927–1930
At a party caucus on July 18, 1927, John Oliver resigned as premier and party leader due to ill health. This was refused and John Duncan MacLean was chosen to be his successor as leader and premier and was made acting premier while Oliver remained nominal premier. Oliver died on August 17, 1927, and MacLean became premier on August 20.

Source: "Morning Leader", July 19, 1927

Following John Duncan MacLean's personal defeat in the 1928 general election Thomas Dufferin Pattullo was unanimously chosen House leader by the Liberal caucus on January 19, 1929. This was confirmed by the party executive on January 21, 1929. He was confirmed as permanent leader at a subsequent convention.

Source: "Vancouver Sun", January 21, 1929

1930 leadership convention
Held May 30, 1930
  Thomas Dufferin Pattullo (acclaimed)

Source: "Montreal Gazette", May 31, 1930

1941 leadership convention
Held December 2, 1941
  John Hart (acclaimed)

Source: "The Leader Post", December 3, 1941

1947 leadership convention
Held December 10, 1947
  Byron Ingemar Johnson 475
 Gordon Sylvester Wismer 467

Source: "Saskatoon Star-Phoenix", December 11, 1947

1953 leadership convention
Held April 8, 1953
  Arthur Laing (acclaimed)

Source: "Vancouver Sun", April 9, 1953

1959 leadership convention
Held on May 16, 1959
  Ray Perrault 494
 George Frederick Thompson Gregory 162

Source: "Montreal Gazette", May 19, 1959

1968 leadership convention
Held on October 5, 1968
  Pat McGeer 686
 Garde Gardom 316

Source: The Leader-Post, October 7, 1968)

1972 leadership convention
Held on May 22, 1972
  David Anderson  388
Bill Vander Zalm  177

1975 leadership convention
Held on September 28, 1975, in Burnaby, British Columbia

  Gordon Gibson (acclaimed)

1979 leadership convention
Held on February 19, 1979

  Jev Tothill  250
 Hugh Chesley 51

(Source: Globe and Mail, February 19, 1979)

1981 leadership convention
Held on May 25, 1981

  Shirley McLoughlin  195
Tom Finkelstein 146
Roland Bouwman  48

(Note:  There were six spoiled ballots.)

1984 leadership convention
Held on March 31, 1984, in Richmond, British Columbia

  Art Lee  319
Stan Roberts 126
William Pryhitko 43
Ron Biggs 36

1987 leadership convention
Held on October 30, 1987, in Richmond, British Columbia

  Gordon Wilson (acclaimed)

One other candidate, Clive Tanner, had been in the race through the spring and summer, but withdrew in August after sustaining a leg injury which affected his ability to campaign.

1993 leadership challenge
Held on September 11, 1993
  Gordon Campbell  4141
Gordon Gibson  1600
Gordon Wilson  531
Linda Reid  166
Wilf Hurd  62
Allan Warnke  36
Charles McKinney  4

2011 leadership election

Held on February 26, 2011

The rounds were counted in terms of points, with 100 points allocated per electoral district.

2018 leadership election

Held February 3, 2018

 = Eliminated from next round
 = Winner

2022 leadership election

A leadership election was held on February 5, 2022 to elect a new party leader following the resignation of Andrew Wilkinson after the 2020 British Columbia general election. 

 = Eliminated from next round
 = Winner

References